Ogna Station is a railway station located at Ogna in Hå, Norway on the Sørland Line. The station is served by the Jæren Commuter Rail between Stavanger and Egersund. The station was opened in 1878. Prior to 1919, the name was spelled Ogne.

References

External links
 Jernbaneverket Ogna profile 

Railway stations on the Sørlandet Line
Railway stations in Hå
Railway stations opened in 1878
1878 establishments in Norway